Atiyah Abd al-Rahman (1969 – August 22, 2011), born Jamal Ibrahim Ashtiwi al Misrati, was reported by the US State Department to be a senior member of al-Qaeda and a member of the Libyan Islamic Fighting Group and Ansar al-Sunna. His name may be rendered in English as Atiyah Abdur-rahman or Atiyah Abdul-Rahman or in other ways. After his death he was described in Foreign Policy as a renaissance man for "combining both strategic and ideological savvy".

Atiyah Abd al-Rahman is thought to be the "Atiyah" who wrote a commanding letter to Abu Musab al-Zarqawi in December 2005.

The State Department announcement said that Abd Al Rahman:
 Was a Libyan in his late 30s.
 Was based in Iran, representing al-Qaeda to other Islamist terrorist groups.
 Was appointed to that role by Osama bin Laden.
 Met bin Laden while still in his teens.
 Fled the Republic of the Congo alongside bin Laden as recently as 2001.

Atiyah had volunteered to travel to Afghanistan to fight against its Soviet occupiers in the 1980s, while he was still a teenager.
He was reported to have met and served under Osama bin Laden at that time. The Washington Post reported that another prominent Libyan exile, Noman Benotman, he was sent to Algeria in the 1990s to serve as an envoy to a group they said was then known as the Armed Islamic Group (GIA). He told The Washington Post that the GIA was suspicious of him, held him captive for months, and were considering killing him. He escaped with other captives, after five months of captivity, and, according to Benotman, "He had a very bad experience, and I think is still having nightmares about it." About the massacres that were committed during the Algerian Civil War, Atiyah says: "There are those who [...] say [...] the officers did that, France [did that]; etc. We are just covering up [the truth to exonerate] the people of Islam, [but] all these massacres occurred in the last days of Zitouni and days of Antar Zouabri. All of them [were committed by] the Armed Islamic Group".

He was killed in Pakistan by a CIA predator drone strike on August 22, 2011. Al-Qaeda leader Ayman al-Zawahiri confirmed the death of Abd al-Rahman in a video on December 1, 2011.
Abd al-Rahman was previously reported dead in October 2010.

The State Department's Rewards for Justice offered up to US$1 million for information about him. However, he was removed from the list after he was killed.

Al-Qaeda leader Atiyyatullah Al-Libi's advice was published in Turkistan Islamic Party's magazine "Islamic Turkistan". Issue 19 of the magazine "Islamic Turkistan" cited and reprinted Al Qaeda member Atiyatallah al Libi's (عطية الله الليبي) "Book of "Complete Works" (كتاب الأعمال الكاملة) page 818 where he called India, Thailand, Philippines, Singapore, East Turkestan, the Caucasus, Balkans, Central Asia, Southern Europe and Al Andalus as "occupied Muslim lands" by the "infidels hand" and "infidel governments", naming America as the "original infidel" enemy, and called for them to be all reconquered by the Muslims through jihad. Ahmed Refai Taha and Atiyah Abd al-Rahman were shown in an Al-Qaeda video released by Al Qaeda leader Ayman al-Zawahiri called "Three Sheikhs of Jihad"

See also 
 Targeted killing
 War in North-West Pakistan

References

External links 
  
  
 

1969 births
2011 deaths
Libyan al-Qaeda members
Libyan expatriates in Pakistan
Assassinated al-Qaeda leaders
Deaths by drone strikes of the Central Intelligence Agency in Pakistan
Salafi jihadists
People from Misrata